Gabriel A. Wainer (Gabriel Wainer) is a Canadian/Argentinian computer scientist known for his work in modeling and simulation. He is a Professor in the Department of Systems and Computer Engineering at Carleton University in Ottawa, Canada.

He is the head of the Advanced Real-Time Simulation lab, located at Carleton University's Centre for advanced Simulation and Visualization (V-Sim). He is known for his research in discrete-event simulation, in the Cell-DEVS specification, a variant of Discrete Event System Specification (DEVS).

Education and Career
Wainer graduated in 1993 as a Licenciado in Computer Science  from the University of Buenos Aires. He completed his Ph.D. in software engineering in 1998 at Aix-Marseille University/University of Buenos Aires.

In July 2000, he joined the Department of Systems and Computer Engineering at Carleton University (Ottawa, Canada). He held visiting positions at the University of Arizona, LSIS (CNRS), Université Paul Cézanne, University of Nice Sophia-Antipolis, INRIA Sophia-Antipolis, University of Bordeaux, University of Buenos Aires, and others.

Around 1993 he built the first Real-time version of an open-source Operating System, namely (RT-Minix). The kernel was extended to include Real-Time scheduling, schedulability analysis for predictability, semaphores with priority inversion mechanisms, real-time task fault-tolerant models, majority voting  and a new OS API. This idea was followed by other researchers, leading to the development of the first versions of RTLinux at a time when Linux was still in its infancy.

He contributed to the field of modeling and simulation (M&S), introducing Cell-DEVS, a formalism to build discrete-event cellular models. The formalism and tools were used to define numerous models in different areas: environmental sciences, biomedical, pedestrian flow, systems engineering, architecture and construction, etc.
 
He is the inventor of the DEVStone synthetic benchmark, which is a de facto standard to evaluate DEVS simulators and compare their performance.

Service
Prof. Wainer is a co-founder of Modeling and simulation conferences: SIMUTools, ANNSIM (SCS/IEEE/ACM), the Symposium on Theory of Modeling and Simulation (SCS/ACM/IEEE), and Symposium on Simulation in Architecture and Urban Design - SimAUD (SCS/ACM/IEEE). He was Vice-President Conferences and Vice-President Publications of SCS, Society for Modeling and Simulation International  (2010-2016). 

Prof. Wainer is Editor in Chief of Simulation (journal), member of the Editorial Board of Journal of Simulation, IEEE Computing in Science and Engineering, Wireless Networks (Elsevier), Journal of Defense Modeling and Simulation (SCS).

Books

Dr. Wainer is the author or co-author of books including:
“Real-Time Systems: concepts and applications” (in Spanish), G. Wainer. Nueva Librería, Buenos Aires, Argentina. 1997.
“Methodologies and tools for discrete-event simulation” (in Spanish). G. Wainer. Nueva Librería, Buenos Aires, Argentina. 2003.
“Discrete-Event Modeling and Simulation: a Practitioner's approach”. G. Wainer. CRC Press. Taylor and Francis. 2009.
“Discrete-Event Modeling and Simulation: Theory and Applications”. G. Wainer, P. Mosterman Eds. Taylor and Francis. 2011

Recognition
Wainer is a Fellow of the SCS, Society for Modeling and Simulation International (2016) "for fundamental contributions to discrete-event simulation". He obtained many other awards for his research publications and service. He is one of the few recipients of the SCS McLeod Founder's Award for Distinguished Service to the Profession. He received a Canada 150 Medal in Nepean, ON

References

External links
Home page

Research Articles in DBLP

Computer scientists
Canadian scientists
Living people
University of Buenos Aires alumni
Aix-Marseille University alumni
Academic staff of Carleton University
Year of birth missing (living people)